The Republic of Macedonia (officially under the provisional appellation "former Yugoslav Republic of Macedonia", short "FYR Macedonia") competed at the 2002 Winter Olympics in Salt Lake City, United States.

Alpine skiing

Men

Cross-country skiing

Men
Sprint

1 Starting delay based on 10 km C. results. 
C = Classical style, F = Freestyle

References
Official Olympic Reports
 Olympic Winter Games 2002, full results by sports-reference.com

Nations at the 2002 Winter Olympics
2002
Winter Olympics